Emma Goldman in Exile: From the Russian Revolution to the Spanish Civil War is a 1989 biography of Emma Goldman by historian Alice Wexler. It is a sequel to Emma Goldman in America (1984), which covers Goldman's first five decades.

Bibliography

External links 
 Full text at the Internet Archive

1989 non-fiction books
Beacon Press books
Biographies of Emma Goldman
English-language books